Jonathan Bailey is an English actor known for his versatility on stage and screen. A prolific performer, he has worked on several theatre, television, radio, film, musical recording, and video game productions since his professional debut in 1995. He is the recipient of a Laurence Olivier Award as well as nominations for Evening Standard Theatre and Screen Actor Guild Awards.

Film

Television

Theatre

Cast recordings

Audio

Video games

Awards and nominations

References

External links 

 

Lists of awards received by British actor
British filmographies
Male actor filmographies